A ventifact (also wind-faceted stone, windkanter) is a rock that has been abraded, pitted, etched, grooved, or polished by wind-driven sand or ice crystals. These geomorphic features are most typically found in arid environments where there is little vegetation to interfere with aeolian particle transport, where there are frequently strong winds, and where there is a steady but not overwhelming supply of sand.

Ventifacts can be abraded to eye-catching natural sculptures such as the main features of the White Desert National Park near Farafra oasis in Egypt. In moderately tall, isolated rock outcrops, mushroom shaped pillars of rock may form as the outcrop is eroded by saltating sand grains. This occurs because, even in strong winds, sand grains can't be continuously held in the air. Instead, the particles bounce along the ground, rarely reaching higher than a few feet above the Earth. Over time, the bouncing sand grains can erode the lower portions of a ventifact, while leaving a larger less eroded cap. The resulting forms thus frequently resemble fantastical stone mushrooms.

Individual stones, such as those forming desert pavement, are often found with grooved, etched, or polished surfaces where these same wind-driven processes have slowly worn away the rock.

Stones with a small number of wind facets have names reflecting this number, e.g. a  dreikanter is a roughly pyramidal stone having 3 wind facets (and one buried, rounded side).

When ancient ventifacts are preserved without being moved or disturbed, they may serve as a paleo-wind indicators. The wind direction at the time the ventifact formed will be parallel to grooves or striations cut in the rock. 

Ventifacts have also been discovered on Mars, where such sharp immobile rocks have caused significant damage to the wheels of the Curiosity rover. An example of a Martian ventifact was named Jake Matijevic. By analyzing its shape, it was possible to reconstruct the main wind direction which sculpted the rock.

See also

, Antarctica

References

External links

Aeolian landforms
Petrology
Rocks